Tatiana Valeryevna Malinina (born 28 January 1973) is a Russian-Uzbek retired figure skater who competed for Uzbekistan. She is the 1999 Grand Prix Final champion, the 1999 Four Continents champion, a two-time (1998, 2001) NHK Trophy champion, and a ten-time (1993–2002) Uzbek national champion.

Personal life 
Malinina was born on 28 January 1973 in Novosibirsk, Russian SFSR. Her mother was a gymnast and her father a figure skater. The family moved to Tashkent, Uzbek SSR, when she was a teenager. In 1996, Malinina returned to Russia and lived in Yekaterinburg until moving to Dale City, Virginia in 1998. She graduated from the Siberian Academy of Physical Culture in Omsk, Russia.

In January 2000, Malinina married Roman Skorniakov. Their son, Ilia Malinin (born in 2004), is a competitive figure skater for the United States. Their daughter was born in 2014.

Career 
Malinina competed at ten consecutive World Championships beginning in 1993. She finished 8th at the 1998 Winter Olympics in Nagano, Japan.

Malinina began the 1998–1999 Grand Prix season with a 5th-place finish at the 1998 Skate America. Shortly afterward, in November 1998, Malinina and Skorniakov settled in Dale City, Virginia, drawn by better training conditions. In December, Malinina won her first Grand Prix title at the 1998 NHK Trophy and qualified for her first GPF Final. In February 1999, she competed at the inaugural Four Continents Championships and became its first ladies' gold medalist. The following month, she defeated both Maria Butyrskaya and Irina Slutskaya for the gold medal at the Grand Prix Final, held in Saint Petersburg. She finished her season by placing a career-best 4th at the World Championships.

In the 1999–2000 season, Malinina had groin and foot injuries. She finished 18th at the 2000 World Championships. Igor Ksenofontov, the coach of Malinina and Skorniakov, died suddenly in 1999.

Valeri Malinin coached her part-time in the 2000–2001 season. She won bronze medals at her two Grand Prix events, the 2000 Sparkassen Cup on Ice and 2000 NHK Trophy. She was 5th at the Grand Prix Final, 4th at Four Continents and 13th at Worlds.

Malinina and Skorniakov coached each other in the 2001–2002 season. She was 6th at the 2001 Sparkassen Cup on Ice and then won gold at the 2001 NHK Trophy. Malinina withdrew from the 2002 Winter Olympics after the short program due to the flu. She finished 15th at Worlds and then retired from competition as the couple planned to start a family.

Programs

Results

Note: Malinina withdrew before the free skate at the 2002 Winter Olympics due to illness, having placed 13th in the short program.

References

External links 

 

1973 births
Living people
Uzbekistani female single skaters
Olympic figure skaters of Uzbekistan
Figure skaters at the 1998 Winter Olympics
Figure skaters at the 2002 Winter Olympics
Four Continents Figure Skating Championships medalists
Asian Games medalists in figure skating
Figure skaters at the 1996 Asian Winter Games
Figure skaters at the 1999 Asian Winter Games
Sportspeople from Tashkent
Uzbekistani people of Russian descent
Medalists at the 1996 Asian Winter Games
Medalists at the 1999 Asian Winter Games
Asian Games gold medalists for Uzbekistan
Asian Games silver medalists for Uzbekistan
People from Dale City, Virginia